Speedwell is an unincorporated community located in Madison County, Kentucky, United States. Its post office  is closed. It is located at the junction of Kentucky Route 374 and Kentucky Route 499.

The Viney Fork Baptist Church on the National Register of Historic Places is located within the community.

References

Unincorporated communities in Madison County, Kentucky
Unincorporated communities in Kentucky